Jeffrey Adam Larentowicz (born August 5, 1983) is an American former soccer player. He was a starting midfielder on the Colorado Rapids' 2010 MLS Cup Championship team, and a starting defender for Atlanta United's 2018 Cup-winning side.

During his career as a soccer player, Larentowicz was described as one of the most consistent midfielders in Major League Soccer, adept at passing and possession while well above average in tackling, tracking and defensive cover.

Youth and college
Born in Pasadena, California, to parents of Polish descent, Larentowicz played college soccer for Brown University from 2001 to 2004. In his four seasons there he played in 66 matches, amassing 7 goals and 6 assists, helping Brown to two Ivy League Championships. Before Brown, he helped lead traditional Philadelphia-area power Chestnut Hill Academy to back-to-back Interacademic League championships in 2000 and 2001. He also captained the FC Delco Arsenal to two USYSA National Championships in 2002 and 2003.

Professional career

New England Revolution

Larentowicz was selected in the fourth round, 45th overall in the 2005 MLS Supplemental Draft by New England Revolution. He spent his first season on the bench, playing only one minute with the first team all year. However, in 2006 Larentowicz came into more playing time through injuries, starting 19 games and appearing in a further seven. He scored his first-ever MLS goal on August 27, 2006 at a home game against the Columbus Crew. In 2007, he firmly established himself as a regular starter for the Revolution, playing all but two games as defensive midfielder alongside Shalrie Joseph.

Larentowicz has been known by various nicknames. He acquired Ginja (or Ginger) Ninja after scoring an acrobatic goal against Chicago Fire on May 6, 2007. As a defensive midfielder who occasionally ventures into the offensive half of the pitch, he was called der Kaiser by Paul Mariner, a reference to Franz Beckenbauer. He's also known as "Big Red."

Colorado Rapids
On January 21, 2010, he was traded to Colorado Rapids along with Wells Thompson in exchange for Preston Burpo, Cory Gibbs, a 2011 MLS SuperDraft pick, and allocation money.

On November 17, 2011, it was announced that he was training with Premier League club Bolton Wanderers following a recommendation by United States national team coach Jürgen Klinsmann.

Chicago Fire
On January 16, 2013, Larentowicz was traded with a second-round 2013 MLS SuperDraft pick to Chicago Fire in exchange for a first-round selection in the 2013 SuperDraft, allocation money, and a 2013 international roster slot. In the 2013 season, Larentowicz proved an effective addition to the Fire squad appearing in 32 games, scoring two goals, and contributing four assists. He was always entrusted with the captaincy in the absence of Logan Pause in the Fire's starting 11. He became the full-time captain of the Fire after Pause's retirement in 2014.

LA Galaxy
Larentowicz's option wasn't picked up by Chicago at the end of the 2015 MLS season. Larentowicz became a free agent and signed with LA Galaxy on January 6, 2016. He made his debut against Real Salt Lake on April 23, 2016, helping the Galaxy end the last undefeated streak of this season with a 5–2 victory. On July 4, 2016, Larentowicz scored his first goal for the Galaxy in a 2–0 win over Vancouver Whitecaps.

Atlanta United

Larentowicz signed as a free agent with Atlanta United in December 2016, and began play with the team in their inaugural 2017 season. On September 24, 2017, he scored his first goal for the team in a 2–0 win over Montreal Impact. In December 2017, Larentowicz re-signed again with Atlanta United for the 2018 season.  On November 24, 2020, Atlanta United announced the expiration of Larentowicz's contract and that he would not be returning to the roster for the 2021 season.

Larentowicz announced his retirement from professional soccer on April 5, 2021.

International career
On December 22, 2010, Larentowicz received his first call up to train with the senior U.S. national team. He made his international debut a month later in a friendly match against Chile.
On August 25, 2011, it was announced that Larentowicz would play for the U.S. national team in two friendly matches against Costa Rica and Belgium.

Career statistics 
As of November 23, 2020

 Notes

Honors

Club
New England Revolution
Lamar Hunt U.S. Open Cup (1): 2007
North American SuperLiga (1): 2008

Colorado Rapids
MLS Cup (1): 2010

Atlanta United
MLS Cup (1): 2018
Campeones Cup (1): 2019
U.S. Open Cup (1): 2019

References

External links
 
 

1983 births
Living people
American people of Polish descent
American soccer players
Association football midfielders
Atlanta United FC players
Brown Bears men's soccer players
Chestnut Hill Academy alumni
Chicago Fire FC players
Colorado Rapids players
LA Galaxy players
LA Galaxy II players
Major League Soccer All-Stars
Major League Soccer players
New England Revolution draft picks
New England Revolution players
People from West Chester, Pennsylvania
Seacoast United Phantoms players
Soccer players from California
Soccer players from Pennsylvania
Sportspeople from Chester County, Pennsylvania
United States men's international soccer players
USL Championship players
USL Second Division players